Athlone–Longford was a parliamentary constituency represented in Dáil Éireann, the lower house of the Irish parliament or Oireachtas from 1937 to 1948. The constituency elected 3 deputies (Teachtaí Dála, commonly known as TDs) to the Dáil, on the system of proportional representation by means of the single transferable vote (PR-STV).

History 
The constituency was created for the 1937 general election under the Electoral (Revision of Constituencies) Act 1935, replacing the old Longford–Westmeath constituency.

Under the Electoral (Amendment) Act 1947, the constituency was abolished, and the Longford–Westmeath constituency was re-created for the 1948 general election.

Boundaries 
The constituency consisted of all of County Longford and parts of counties Roscommon and Westmeath. In the 1935 Act, its boundaries were defined as:
"The administrative County of Longford,
The district electoral divisions of:
Athlone West Rural, Ballydangan, Ballynamona, Caltragh, Carnagh, Carrowreagh, Castlesampson, Cloonburren, Cloonown, Crannagh, Creagh, Culliagh, Drumlosh, Dysart, Kilcar, Kiltoom, Lecarrow, Moore, Rockhill, Taghboy, Taghma-connell, Thomastown and Turrock in the administrative County of Roscommon; and
The district electoral divisions of:
Ardnagragh, Athlone East Rural, Auburn, Carn, Castledaly, Doonis, Glassan, Killinure, Mount Temple, Moydrum, Muckanagh, Noughaval and Tubbrit and the Urban District of Athlone in the administrative County of Westmeath."

TDs

Elections

1944 general election

1943 general election

1938 general election

1937 general election

See also
Dáil constituencies
Politics of the Republic of Ireland
Historic Dáil constituencies
Elections in the Republic of Ireland

References

External links
 Oireachtas Members Database

Historic constituencies in County Longford
Dáil constituencies in the Republic of Ireland (historic)
1937 establishments in Ireland
1948 disestablishments in Ireland
Constituencies established in 1937
Constituencies disestablished in 1948